2029 Binomi, provisional designation , is a Vestian asteroid from the inner regions of the asteroid belt, approximately 7 kilometers in diameter.

The asteroid was discovered on 11 September 1969, by Paul Wild at Zimmerwald Observatory near Bern, Switzerland. It was named for the fictitious mathematician "Alessandro Binomi" who invented the binomial formula.

Classification and orbit 

Binomi is a member of the Vesta family, one of the largest collisional populations of the inner asteroid belt. It orbits the Sun at a distance of 2.0–2.7 AU once every 3 years and 7 months (1,316 days). Its orbit has an eccentricity of 0.13 and an inclination of 6° with respect to the ecliptic.

The body's observation arc begins at Crimea–Nauchnij on 10 September 1969, the night before its official discovery observation at Zimmerwald.

Physical characteristics 

In the SMASS classification, Binomi is a stony S-type asteroid.

Lightcurves 

In January 2014, two rotational lightcurves of Binomi were obtained from photometric observations in the R-band by astronomers at the Palomar Transient Factory in California. Lightcurve analysis gave a rotation period of 3.7555 and 3.756 hours with a brightness variation of 0.51 and 0.52 magnitude, respectively.

Diameter and albedo 

According to the survey carried out by NASA's Wide-field Infrared Survey Explorer with its subsequent NEOWISE mission, Binomi measures 6.893 and 7.050 kilometers in diameter and its surface has an albedo of 0.2468 and 0.257, respectively.

The Collaborative Asteroid Lightcurve Link assumes an albedo of 0.24 – derived from 8 Flora, the largest member and namesake of its family – and calculates a diameter of 5.39 kilometers based on an absolute magnitude of 13.51.

Naming 

This minor planet was named for the fictitious mathematician "Alessandro Binomi", inventor of the binomial formula. This act of parody science was common among students at German-speaking universities (:de:Binomi). The real inventors of the binomial formula are the Bernoullis, after whom the asteroid 2034 Bernoulli was named. The approved naming citation was published by the Minor Planet Center on 1 August 1981.

References

External links 
 Asteroid Lightcurve Database (LCDB), query form (info )
 Dictionary of Minor Planet Names, Google books
 Asteroids and comets rotation curves, CdR – Observatoire de Genève, Raoul Behrend
 Discovery Circumstances: Numbered Minor Planets (1)-(5000) – Minor Planet Center
 
 

002029
Discoveries by Paul Wild (Swiss astronomer)
Named minor planets
002029
19690911